R.G.W. is single by Japanese rock duo Puffy, released on November 17, 2010. The meaning of the name is red, green and white, which are the symbolic colors of Christmas.

A limited edition of the single was released along with the regular edition. The limited edition features an extra live DVD showing footage of 6 songs from Puffy's 2010 Gekidan Asesu Tour.
The song was used as the theme song for the Japanese release of Toy Story 3, the b-sides were used as theme songs for TV shows as well, the first one was used for NTV's DON.

Track listing

CD single
R.G.W
Jet Love
Koi No Yamaarashi

DVD (Limited Edition only)
Nice Buddy
Ai no shirushi
Circuit no Musume
Complaint
Boogie Woogie No. 5
Youkai PUFFY

Chart performance
The single peaked at number 44 on the singles chart, selling 2.091 copies that week, and stayed on the chart for 2 weeks. The track failed to enter the top 50 in the Billboard charts and remained for only one week on the Hot Single Sales and Hot 100, for the Hot Airplay chart the single drop to number 89 before exciting the chart the next week. On J-Wave the single debuted at number 84 and the next week peaked at 52, the song stayed another 2 weeks on the chart.

Oricon Sales Chart

Billboard Japan Sales Chart

J-Wave Airplay Chart

References

2010 singles
Puffy AmiYumi songs
2010 songs
Ki/oon Music singles
Song articles with missing songwriters